Gnaeus, also spelled Cnaeus, was a Roman praenomen derived from the Latin naevus, a birthmark.  It was a common name borne by many individuals throughout Roman history, including:

Individuals
Gnaeus Acerronius Proculus, a consul of the Roman Empire in 37 AD
Gnaeus Arrius Antoninus (born 31 AD), member of the Arrius family of consular rank
Gnaeus Aufidius Orestes (died 1st-century BC), Roman politician who was elected consul in 71 BC
Gnaeus Calpurnius Piso (disambiguation)
Gnaeus Claudius Severus (consul 167), a Roman senator and philosopher who lived in the Roman Empire during the 2nd century
Gnaeus Cornelius Cinna Magnus (1st-century BC–1st-century AD), son of suffect consul Lucius Cornelius Cinna
Gnaeus Cornelius Dolabella, a consul of the Roman Republic in 81 BC, with Marcus Tullius Decula
Gnaeus Cornelius Scipio Asina, a Roman politician involved in the First Punic War
Gnaeus Cornelius Scipio Calvus (3rd-century–211 BC), Roman general and statesman
Gnaeus Domitius Afer (died 59), a Roman orator and advocate
Gnaeus Domitius Ahenobarbus (consul 32 BC) (died 31 BC), general of the 1st century BC
Gnaeus Domitius Ahenobarbus (consul 32) (17 BC–40 AD), relative of emperors of the 1st century AD
Gnaeus Domitius Ahenobarbus (disambiguation), other individuals belonging to the Domitii Ahenobarbi
Gnaeus Domitius Corbulo (7–67 AD), general of the 1st century AD
Gnaeus Egnatius (fl. second century BC), builder of Via Egnatia
Gnaeus Gellius (2nd century BC), the author of a history of Rome from the earliest epoch
Gnaeus Julius Agricola (40–93 AD), Gallo-Roman general responsible for much of the Roman conquest of Britain
Gnaeus Julius Verus, Roman general and senator of the mid-2nd century AD, eventually becoming governor of Britain
Gnaeus Lucretius, a Roman moneyer who minted denarii in Rome c. 136 BCE
Gnaeus Mallius Maximus, a Roman politician and general, consul in 105 BC
Gnaeus Manlius, a Roman Praetor who was involved in the Third Servile War with Gnaeus Tremellius Scrofa
Gnaeus Manlius Cincinnatus (died 5th-century BC), first of the patrician gens Manlia to obtain the consulship
Gnaeus Manlius Vulso (consul 189 BC), a Roman consul for the year 189 BC, together with Marcus Fulvius Nobilior
Gnaeus Marcius Coriolanus (fl. 5th century BC), Roman general
Gnaeus Naevius (264–201 BC), Roman epic poet and dramatist of the Old Latin period
Gnaeus Octavius (consul 87 BC) (died 87 BC), Roman senator elected consul of the Roman Republic in 87 BC alongside Lucius Cornelius Cinna
Gnaeus Papirius Aelianus, a governor of Roman Britain between 145 and 147
Gnaeus Papirius Carbo (c. 130–82 BC), three-time consul of ancient Rome
Gnaeus Pompeius (son of Pompey the Great) (75–45 BC), Roman politician and general from the late Republic (1st century BC)
Gnaeus Pompeius Longinus (died AD 105), Legate of the Judaea in the time of Domitian.
Gnaeus Pompeius Magnus, or Pompey the Great, (106–48 BC), military and political leader of the late Roman Republic, consul three times
Gnaeus Pompeius Strabo (135 BC - 87 BC), Roman senator, promagistrate in Sicily, and consul
Gnaeus Pompeius Trogus, 1st-century BC Roman historian of the Celtic tribe of the Vocontii in Gallia Narbonensis
Gnaeus Sentius Saturninus, the name of two Roman senators, father and son
Gnaeus Servilius Caepio (consul 203 BC), a Roman statesman who served as Roman consul in 203 BC
Gnaeus Servilius Geminus (3rd-century–216 BC), Roman consul during the Second Punic War

See also
Gnaeus (praenomen)
Cn (disambiguation)